Chori Chori is a 2003 Indian Hindi-language romantic comedy-drama film directed by Milan Luthria. It stars Ajay Devgn and Rani Mukerji in the lead roles. It is not related to the 1956 Hindi film of the same name. It is inspired by the Hollywood film Housesitter (1992).

Plot
Khushi (Rani Mukerji) is a happy-go-lucky orphan living in Delhi. She meets Ranbir Malhotra (Ajay Devgn) through a chance encounter one day before she is fired from her job. He tells her about a dream house that he has built in Shimla. After being dismissed from her job, she locates the bungalow and moves in, informing everyone that she is Ranbir's fiancée. There she meets Ranbir's family and Pooja (Sonali Bendre), Ranbir's love. When Ranbir returns, at first he is outraged at Khushi's intrusion in his life but then decides to play along with her to make Pooja jealous and fall in love with him. Khushi and Ranbir end up falling in love. However, Khushi's close encounter with reality and Ranbir's old commitments hold them back for a long time before they finally listen to their hearts.

Cast
 Ajay Devgn as Ranbir Malhotra
Rani Mukerji as Khushi
 Sonali Bendre as Pooja
 Kamini Kaushal as Beeji
 Tiku Talsania as Chachaji
 Smita Jaykar as Mrs. Malhotra
 Sadashiv Amrapurkar as Chacha
 Shashikala as Chachi
 Satish Shah

Soundtrack
Music was composed by duo Sajid–Wajid, while lyrics were penned by Anand Bakshi.

References

External links 
 

2000s Hindi-language films
2003 films
Films directed by Milan Luthria